The Gimcrack Stakes is an Australian Turf Club Group 3  Thoroughbred horse race, for two-year-old fillies, held with set weight conditions, over a distance of 1000 metres at Randwick Racecourse in Sydney, Australia in early October. Total prize money for the race is A$200,000.

History

Name
The event is named after Gimcrack, a successful English racehorse in the 18th century. Gimcrack won twenty-seven times in a career of thirty-six races. Along with the Breeders' Plate these are the first two year old races in the New South Wales racing season. Starters in these event must participate in trials a couple of weeks before these event to gain acceptance.

1942 racebook

Distance
1906–1972 - 5 furlongs (~1000 metres)
1973–2007 – 1000 metres
2008 – 1100 metres
2019 onwards - 1000 metres

Grade

1906–1978 -  Principal Race
1979–1991 -  Group 3
1992–2018 -  Listed Race
2019 onwards - Group 3

Venue
 1983, 2001 - Warwick Farm Racecourse

Winners

2022 - Platinum Jubilee 
2021 - Coolangatta 
2020 - Enthaar 
2019 - Every Rose 
2018 - Catch Me 
2017 - Satin Slipper 
2016 - Jorda 
2015 - Calliope 
2014 - Calaverite 
2013 - Alpha Miss 
2012 - Brilliant Bisc 
2011 - Hussousa 
2010 - Defiant Dame
2009 - Gybe
2008 Oct. - Our Joan Of Arc 
2008 Mar. - Portillo  
2007 - ‡race not held and postponed to 1 March 2008
2006 - Hurried Choice 
2005 - Mirror Mirror 
2004 - Media 
2003 - Segments 
2002 - Spurcent  
2001 - De Lollies 
2000 - Donna Natalia 
1999 - Speedy Bell 
1998 - Katima 
1997 - Crimson Flight 
1996 - Dantelah 
1995 - Apple Danish 
1994 - Millie 
1993 - Warning Siren 
1992 - Fitting 
1991 - Watch 
1990 - Marskin 
1989 - Kincay 
1988 - Screen Idol 
1987 - Startling Lass 
1986 - Mother Duck 
1985 - Dream's Delight 
1984 - Dandolera 
1983 - Coming Closer 
1982 - Belle Tetue 
1981 - Vaindarra 
1980 - Black Shoes 
1979 -   
1978 - Silver Mystic 
1977 - ♯Spanish Yacht / Trimaran
1976 - ♯Rainy Day / Princess Talaria
1975 - ♯Fleet Princess / Schemer 
1974 - Intriguing 
1973 - Sufficient 
1972 - Lady Lido 
1971 - Light Praise 
1970 - My Amazon 
1969 - Fleet Royal 
1968 - Natal Lass 
1967 - Miss Pola 
1966 - Ruling Ways 
1965 - Port Joy 
1964 - Fawnia 
1963 - Attentive 
1962 - Megalong 
1961 - Jan's Image 
1960 - Courteous 
1959 - Wenona Girl 
1958 - Endure 
1957 - Andabri 
1956 - Concert Star 
1955 - Sajax 
1954 - Ultrablue 
1953 - Seofon 
1952 - Love To All 
1951 - Cultured 
1950 - Merrie Merton 
1949 - Mighty Song 
1948 - Rhumba 
1947 - Midwise 
1946 - Nechi 
1945 - Sweet Chime 
1944 - Civic Pride 
1943 - Scaur Fel 	 
1942 - Ajixa 
1941 - Hesione 
1940 - ll Love 
1939 - Trueness 
1938 - Merry Smile 
1937 - Gay Romance 
1936 - Record 
1935 - Spirits 
1934 - Lady Primrose 
1933 - Visage 
1932 - Leila Vale 
1931 - Precious Gif 
1930 - Bassanton 
1929 - Trenette 
1928 - Malvina
1927 - Belle Gallante 
1926 - Eulalie 
1925 - Kanooka 
1924 - Chignon 
1923 - Periwoo 
1922 - Princess Dighton 
1921 - Lady Aura 
1920 - Furious 
1919 - Delight 
1918 - Sue 
1917 - Sweet Lady 
1916 - Manna 
1915 - Eulacre 
1914 - Starland 
1913 - Woorak 
1912 - Beragoon 
1911 - Ventura 
1910 - Respect 
1909 - Gigandra 
1908 - Nandillyan Maid 
1907 - Armlet 
1906 - Maltine 

♯ Run in divisions

‡ Not held because of outbreak of equine influenza

See also
 List of Australian Group races
 Group races

External links 
Gimcrack Stakes

References

Horse races in Australia
Flat horse races for two-year-olds